Andrei Fernando Dragu (born 7 October 1999) is a Romanian professional footballer who plays as a left back for Liga I side FC Botoșani.

Club career

FC Botosani
Dragu transferred to Liga I side Botoşani in the summer of 2021. He made his league debut against FCSB on 15 July. He scored his first league goal against CFR Cluj on 11 December 2022.

Career statistics

Club

References

External links
 
 
 Footballdatabase Profile
 FC Botoșani profile

1999 births
Living people
Sportspeople from Târgu Jiu
Romanian footballers
Association football defenders
CS Luceafărul Oradea players
ACS Viitorul Târgu Jiu players
FC Botoșani players
Liga I players
Liga II players